Bonaventure—Gaspé—Îles-de-la-Madeleine—Pabok (formerly known as Gaspé—Bonaventure—Îles-de-la-Madeleine) was a federal electoral district in Quebec, Canada, that was represented in the House of Commons of Canada from 1997 to 2004.

It was created in 1996 as "Gaspé—Bonaventure—Îles-de-la-Madeleine" riding from Bonaventure—Îles-de-la-Madeleine and Gaspé ridings. It was abolished in 2003 when it was merged into Gaspésie—Îles-de-la-Madeleine.

The district consisted of the cities of Chandler, Gaspé, Grande-Rivière, Murdochville, New Richmond and Percé, and the Regional County Municipalities of Bonaventure, La Côte-de-Gaspé, Les Îles-de-la-Madeleine and Pabok.

Members of Parliament

This riding elected the following Members of Parliament:

The riding was one of the more federalist in eastern Quebec. Bernier only narrowly won in 1997 over Patrick Gagnon of the Liberals, and did not run again in 2000. Farrah won the open seat handily.

Election results

See also 

 List of Canadian federal electoral districts
 Past Canadian electoral districts

External links
 Riding history from the Library of Parliament
 Gaspé—Bonaventure—Îles-de-la-Madeleine
 Bonaventure—Gaspé—Îles-de-la-Madeleine—Pabok

Former federal electoral districts of Quebec
Gaspé, Quebec